Kelly Hardie (born 21 November 1969 in Perth, Western Australia) is an Australian softball pitcher who won the bronze medal at the 2000 Summer Olympics.

References 

1969 births
Australian softball players
Living people
Olympic softball players of Australia
Softball players at the 2000 Summer Olympics
Softball players at the 2008 Summer Olympics
Olympic bronze medalists for Australia
Sportspeople from Perth, Western Australia
Olympic medalists in softball
Medalists at the 2008 Summer Olympics
Medalists at the 2000 Summer Olympics